Ferdinand Caremans (6 July 1893 – 13 December 1967) was a Belgian footballer. He played in one match for the Belgium national football team in 1922.

References

External links
 
 

1893 births
1967 deaths
Belgian footballers
Belgium international footballers
Footballers from Antwerp
Association football defenders
Royal Antwerp F.C. players